The Chänelpass (1,791 m) is a high mountain pass of the Bernese Alps, located on the border between the Swiss cantons of Fribourg and Bern. It connect Plaffeien (Fribourg) with Oberwil im Simmental (Bern). The pass lies on the watershed between the Sense and the Simme and is located between the Märe and the Schafarnisch. It is traversed by a trail.

References

External links
Chänelpass on Hikr

Mountain passes of the Alps
Mountain passes of the canton of Bern
Mountain passes of the canton of Fribourg